Richard Realf Braggins  (December 25, 1879 – August 16, 1963) was an American baseball player who pitched in only four games over the course of about six weeks for the 1901 Cleveland Blues.  In 32 innings he gave up 17 runs on 44 hits, struck out 1 and walked 15. He attended Case School of Applied Science (now Case Western Reserve University) from 1898 to 1901 where he was a member of the baseball and track teams.  Braggins, while also a player, was manager of the Case baseball team from 1899 to 1901.

Braggins was a member of Phi Delta Theta fraternity.

References

External links

1879 births
1963 deaths
Baseball players from Pennsylvania
People from Mercer, Pennsylvania
Cleveland Blues (1901) players
Major League Baseball pitchers
Case Western Spartans baseball coaches
Case Western Spartans baseball players
Cleveland Lake Shores players